Canada Stream is a small meltwater stream flowing east-southeast from the front of Canada Glacier into Lake Fryxell, in Taylor Valley, Victoria Land, Antarctica. It was named in association with Canada Glacier by the New Zealand Antarctic Place-Names Committee in 1983.

References
 

Rivers of Victoria Land
McMurdo Dry Valleys